The Council for the Selection of Judges is a body in Kyrgyzstan responsible for the appointment of judges. The Organization for Security and Co-operation in Europe have argued that the Council suffers from excessive politization and reform is needed to guarantee the independence of the Kyrgyz judiciary.

See also
Prosecutor General's Office of Kyrgyzstan
Judiciary Reform Commission (Kyrgyzstan) 
National Council for Judicial Affairs (Kyrgyzstan)

References

Politics of Kyrgyzstan
Judiciary of Kyrgyzstan
Judicial nominations and appointments